Cümşüdlü (also, Dzhumshudin and Dzhyumshyudlyu) is a village and municipality in the Goygol Rayon of Azerbaijan.  It has a population of 1,590.

References 

Populated places in Goygol District